The 1926 Buffalo Bisons football team represented the University of Buffalo as a member of the New York State Conference during the 1926 college football season. Led by Russell Carrick in his third season as head coach, the team compiled an overall record of 0–8 with a mark of 0–5 in conference play, placing last out of nine teams.

Schedule

References

Buffalo
Buffalo Bulls football seasons
College football winless seasons
Buffalo Bison football